Jamison (also, Jamieson City) is a former settlement in Plumas County, California. It lay at an elevation of 4774 feet (1455 m).

The Jamison post office operated from 1871 to 1877 and from 1880 to 1882.

References

Former populated places in California
Former settlements in Plumas County, California